Campbell Flakemore (born 6 August 1992) is an Australian former professional cyclist, who rode professionally between 2011 and 2015 for the  and  squads.

However, at the end of 2015 he decided to retire from cycling.

Major results

2011
 6th Time trial, Oceania Under-23 Road Championships
2012
 Tour of Tasmania
1st Stages 1 (TTT) & 8
 1st Stage 9 Tour of the Great South Coast
 1st Stage 9 Tour of the Murray River
 3rd Time trial, National Under-23 Road Championships
 3rd Overall New Zealand Cycle Classic
1st Stage 1 (ITT)
 5th Time trial, Oceania Road Championships
2013
 1st Chrono Champenois
 1st Stage 5 (ITT) Thüringen Rundfahrt der U23
 2nd Time trial, Oceania Under-23 Road Championships
 3rd Time trial, National Under-23 Road Championships
 4th Time trial, UCI Under-23 Road World Championships
 9th Overall Olympia's Tour
1st Stage 5 (ITT)
 9th La Côte Picarde
2014
 1st  Time trial, UCI Under-23 Road World Championships
 1st Prologue Tour de l'Avenir
 2nd Time trial, Oceania Under-23 Road Championships
 3rd Chrono Champenois
 4th Time trial, National Under-23 Road Championships
2015
 National Road Championships
4th Road race
6th Time trial

References

External links

 
 
 

1992 births
Living people
Australian male cyclists